The Progressive Democratic Party, (Prachathipatai Kao Na) is a minor political party in Thailand that was dissolved. It was founded on 5 March 2005, and had about 11,000 members at its peak. On 30 May 2007 its dissolution was ordered by the Constitutional Court, as the party had falsified membership records of their candidates for the 2006 election in Trang Province.

References

Banned political parties in Thailand
Defunct political parties in Thailand
Political parties established in 2005
Political parties disestablished in 2007
2005 establishments in Thailand